Atma Ram (born ) was a Hindu minister and author in Afghanistan. He was said to have dominated trade between India and Turan in this period.

Writings

References

External links 

 

1937 births
Afghan Hindus
Government ministers of Afghanistan
Year of death unknown
Year of birth unknown